The Gurdwara Sahib is a Sikh place of worship or Gurdwara in Handsworth, Birmingham, England. It was built in the late 1970s under the spiritual guidance of Puran Singh (d. 1983) and the leadership of Norang Singh (d. 1995). The Spiritual leadership of the jatha is now continued through the vision of Mohinder Singh.

The gurdwara spans an area of about 25,000 square meters and the building is four stories high. There are five main Darbar Halls and three Langar Halls. There are approximately 100 rooms, most of which are for the sangat who want to stay at the Gurdwara for the night and have facilities for sleeping and washing.

The main Darbar is used for continuous Akhand Path recital. A new Paath is started on Monday, Wednesday and Friday mornings, unless a Samagam "community meeting" is under way.

At Samagam programs, there is Sampat Paath recitation of a shabda: each line of the gurbani is followed by a sampat. Sampath Paath usually takes eleven days of continuous reading.

See also
List of places named after Guru Nanak Dev

References

Religious buildings and structures in Birmingham, West Midlands
Gurdwaras in England
Memorials to Guru Nanak